The Guardian is a daily newspaper published 5 days a week in Charlottetown, Prince Edward Island, Canada.

The paper was originally launched in the 1870s as The Presbyterian and Evangelical Protestant Union, owned by Presbyterian minister Stephen G. Lawson. It adopted its current name in 1887.

After a succession of local owners, the newspaper was bought by Thomson Corporation in the 1950s. Southam Newspapers acquired the paper from Thomson in 1996, before being itself acquired by Canwest Global Communications in 2000. Canwest sold the paper to Transcontinental in 2002, before being sold to SaltWire Network, a newly formed parent company of The Chronicle Herald, in April 2017.

The Guardian had a sister publication, The Evening Patriot, which was discontinued in 1995 amid efficiency changes by the publishers.

While the slogan of The Guardian for many years has been 'Covers the Island like the dew', it remains principally a Charlottetown publication, with the Journal Pioneer in Summerside to the west and The Eastern Graphic in Montague to the east. In 2010, the daily weekday circulation was approximately 18,000.

The Guardian is currently printed in Halifax.

See also
List of newspapers in Canada
The Guardian ( Charlottetown Canada) does not publish a newspaper either in print or online on Mondays. It is a Tuesday to Saturday paper only.

References

External links

Daily newspapers published in Prince Edward Island
Mass media in Charlottetown
SaltWire Network publications
Publications established in the 1870s
1870s establishments in Prince Edward Island